National Highway 353K, commonly referred to as NH 353K is a national highway in  India. It is a spur road of National Highway 53. NH-353K traverses the state of Maharashtra in India.

Route 
Nandgaon Peth, Shirkhed, Morshi, Warud.

Junctions  

  Terminal near Nandgaon Peth.
  near Morshi.
  Terminal near Warud.

See also 

 List of National Highways in India
 List of National Highways in India by state

References

External links 

 NH 353K on OpenStreetMap

National highways in India
National Highways in Maharashtra